Kilianella is a genus of the ammonite family Neocomitidae. The shell of Kilianella is evolute with a slightly grooved venter and covered by strong, gently flexious, single or bifurcating ribs.

Kilianella has a widespread distribution on the Lower Cretaceous and has been found in the Upper Berriasian to Upper Valanginian of the Western U.S., Mexico, China, southern Asia, and Europe.

References

Genus Killianella in Ammonites  Crioceratotes.free.fr. 
Paleobiology Database Kilianella entry

Early Cretaceous ammonites
Ammonites of Europe
Ammonitida genera
Perisphinctoidea